Liwan District is one of 11 urban districts of the prefecture-level city of Guangzhou, the capital of Guangdong Province, China. The district is split into two parts by the Pearl River: Xiguan in the northeast and Fangcun in the southwest.

History

Liwan District was named after "Lizhiwan", which is derived from poem of "a bay of green water and red lychees along both banks". Liwan District is positioned in the flourishing west part of Guangzhou, on the northeast bank of the Pearl River.

Liwan was originally a western suburb of Guangzhou known as Xiguan and Huadai/Huadi located in between two counties of Panyu County and Nanhai County. On 15 February 1921 Liwan along with Guangfu (present Yuexiu) formed the City of Guangzhou.

Fangcun, in the western part of Liwan District, lay at the southwest of Guangzhou's downtown area and south of Pearl River. It was established as a "Fangcun District" in 1949 after the Chinese Communist Party took over Guangzhou from the Kuomintang. In 2005, it was withdrawn and merged with Liwan.

Administrative divisions

Transport
Liwan district has a well-developed transport network which enables it to reap benefits as an important place for business. There is a developed traffic network connecting with the railway station and Guangzhou Baiyun International Airport in the north. Renmin Bridge and Zhujiang Tunnel link the banks of the Pearl River in the southern part of Liwan.  Zhujiang Bridge, which connects Nanhai and Foshan, links the east and west together in Liwan's west. Guangzhou South Railway Cargo Station of Jingguang Railway and Xinfeng Terminal are in Liwan's southwest. No. 107 State Highway and Guang-Fo Highway connecting with Guang-Shen Highway are through to Hong Kong. Line 1 of Guangzhou Metro and Inner overhead road pass through the District.

Metro
Liwan is currently service by four metro lines operated by Guangzhou Metro:

 - Chen Clan Academy, Changshou Lu, Huangsha, Fangcun, Huadiwan, Kengkou, Xilang
 - Jiaokou, Tanwei, Zhongshanba, Xichang, Xicun
 - Hesha, Tanwei, Ruyifang, Huangsha, Cultural Park
 - Cultural Park
 - Longxi, Jushu, Xilang, Hedong, Shachong

Tourism
Liwan District has many attractions and historical sites. The historically famous Lizhiwan (lit. Lychee Bay) has a 1000-year history. Shisanhang had a foreign trade privilege for hundred years. Haishan Xianguan had a leader of Lingnan horticulture, which made contribution to the development of Lingnan culture. Now, there are two national key protection units Chen Learning Academy (Chen Clan Temple) and Shamian Ancient Buildings, out of which Chen Learning Academy was elected one of the 8 new scenic spots of Guangzhou. There are several municipality-level relic spots: Hualin Temple, one of Guangzhou's Buddhist “five jungles”, Taoist Zhenwudi Renwei Temple, Jiang Guangding’s former residence, Li Wentian’s Taihua Building and Xiguan big house. In addition, there are historic sites where Dr. Sun Yat-sen, Zhan Tianyou, Chen Shaobai and Tang Tingguang lived or worked. There are Guangya School setup by Zhang Zhidong, a member of the Westernization Movement in the late Qing Dynasty and relic site of Xicun Industrial Zone developed by Chen Jitang when was in power during PC period. All those spots are like pearls dotted in this valuable land and show people its glorious and splendid past.

In order to integrate those typical spots organically for tourists’ convenience, Liwan District Administration divides them into 4 tourist areas, Xiguan Folk Custom Area, Chen Clan Temple Cultural and Leisure Area, Shamian Continental Tourist Area, and Shisanhang Commercial and Cultural Area. It is proposed to build large-scale “Lingnan Custom” tourist project at Xiguan Folk Custom Area so as to provide domestic and foreign tourists with all-directional services in tour, culture, leisure, foods and accommodation.

Liwan District's developed commerce. National ethical commercial street Shangxiajiu Pedestrian Street is arrayed with shops and gathers a lot of businessmen. in 1995, Shangxiajiu Lu was declared the first weekend commercial pedestrian street of Guangzhou. In 1996, it was elected one of the 10 tourist attractions of Guangzhou. There are many special streets such as blackwood and jade street, ceramic crafts street, and more than 100 wholesale markets engaged in traditional Chinese medicine, aquatic products, shoes, stationery, metal ware, textile (knitted), electric appliance (communications) and decoration materials, among which Qingping Traditional Chinese Herbs and Huangsha Aquatic Product Market are State-level markets; Yiyuan Stationery Market, Guangdong Electric Appliance City are province-level markets. Market is flourishing, which radiates the whole nation and the Southeast Asia as well as the world.

Liwan District is a gathering place of star-level restaurants of Guangzhou, including White Swan Hotel, Guangzhou Restaurant, Shengli Hotel, Qingping Restaurant, Taotaoju Restaurant, Lianxianglou Restaurant and Panxi Restaurant. Various special Liwan foods with long history and both famous at home and abroad are available, including Shunji coconut ice cream, Wuzhanji Jidi congee, Tingzai congee, Ouchengji dumpling and Nanxin double-condensed milk.

Economy
Miniso has its headquarters in Liwan District.

Education

Schools include:
 
 Guangzhou True Light Middle School
  (Formerly known as Guangzhou Puiying Middle School)
 The Thirty-Fifth Middle School (广州第三十五中学).

References

External links

Official website of Liwan District Government

 
Districts of Guangzhou